The Charlotte Open was a golf tournament played at Myers Park Country Club in Charlotte, North Carolina from 1944 to 1948.

Winners

References

Former PGA Tour events
Golf in North Carolina